Egicoccus halophilus  is a Gram-positive, moderately halophilic, alkalitolerant, non-spore-forming and non-motile bacterium from the genus Egicoccus which has been isolated from saline-alkaline soil in Xinjiang in China.

References

External links
Type strain of Egicoccus halophilus at BacDive -  the Bacterial Diversity Metadatabase

 

Actinomycetota
Bacteria described in 2016